Sandra Kynes is an American author who has written several books based on her pagan beliefs. Her works include A Year of Ritual, Gemstone Feng Shui, Whispers from the Woods, Sea Magic, Change at Hand and Your Altar.

Kynes' works have been translated into Spanish, Portuguese, Czech, and Russian.

Reception

The Wiccan/Pagan Times writes that  A Year of Ritual presents "a basic handbook of very generic rituals focusing on individuals and covens", describing rituals for The Sabbats and The Esbats; the information is "easy to understand" and the rituals are "ready to go", to the extent that "the experienced practitioner will become bored quickly with the material".

Select bibliography
2002 Gemstone Feng Shui: Creating harmony in home & office  (Llewellyn Worldwide)
2004 A Year of Ritual: Sabbats & Esbats for Solitaries & Covens  (Llewellyn Worldwide)
2006 Whispers from the woods: the lore & magic of trees  (Llewellyn Worldwide)
2007 Your Altar: Creating a Sacred Space for Prayer and Meditation  (Llewellyn Worldwide)
2008 Sea Magic: Connecting with the Ocean's Energy  (Llewellyn Worldwide)
2009 Change at Hand: Balancing Your Energy Through Palmistry, Chakras & Mudras  (Llewellyn Worldwide)
2013 Llewellyn's Complete Book of Correspondences  (Llewellyn Worldwide)

References

External links
Official website
Sandra Kynes interview with Copper Moon E-zine

American women writers
Living people
Year of birth missing (living people)
21st-century American women